Keith Adam Van Horn (born October 23, 1975) is an American former professional basketball player. Van Horn played for the New Jersey Nets, Philadelphia 76ers, New York Knicks, Milwaukee Bucks, and the Dallas Mavericks of the National Basketball Association (NBA).

A forward, Van Horn finished his college basketball career with the Utah Utes as the all-time leading scorer in the history of the Western Athletic Conference (WAC). He was a consensus first-team All-American in 1997. Van Horn was selected by the Philadelphia 76ers with the second pick in the 1997 NBA draft and was traded to the New Jersey Nets on draft night. In his first NBA season, he was named to the 1998 NBA All-Rookie Team. Van Horn played for the Nets from 1997 to 2002, leading the team in scoring in the 1997–98 and 1998–99 seasons, finishing fifth in the NBA in scoring in the 1998–99 season, and was a key member of the 2001–02 Nets' team that made the NBA Finals. He would also go on to play for the 76ers, the New York Knicks, the Milwaukee Bucks, and the Dallas Mavericks. Van Horn averaged 16 points and nearly seven rebounds per game during his NBA career.

College career

Van Horn graduated from Diamond Bar High School in Diamond Bar, California and attended the University of Utah. Rick Majerus recruited him to replace departing star Josh Grant. He played for Utah from 1993 to 1997 and received numerous All American awards during his career at Utah. In Van Horn's first season, he averaged a Utah-freshman record 18.3 points on 51 percent shooting and 8.3 rebounds per game even though his father died during the freshman year. As a sophomore, Van Horn led his team to the NCAA Tournament.

He is well known for his last second heroics, making back to back game winning shots against SMU and New Mexico in the 1997 WAC Conference Tournament. In 1997, he shot 90.4 percent from the free throw line and averaged 22.0 points and 9.5 rebounds per game to lead the Utes to a 29–4 finish and #2 national ranking, the highest in school history. This led to advancing to the NCAA Tournament's Elite Eight. As a senior in 1997, he was a consensus first team All American selection and was named ESPN Men's College Player of the Year.

Among his collegiate accomplishments is being the first player in WAC history to be named Player of the Year three times (1995,1996,1997), being the second player in WAC history to make first team all-WAC four years in a row and being the all-time leading scorer in University of Utah and WAC history with 2,542 points. Van Horn is the University of Utah career leader in points, defensive rebounds, three-point field goals made, free throw percentage and is second in total rebounds. He averaged 20.8 points and 8.8 rebounds in his collegiate career. His #44 basketball jersey was retired by the University of Utah in 1998. In February 2008, he was among 16 players named to the University of Utah's "All-Century" basketball team. Van Horn was inducted to Utah's Crimson Club Hall of Fame in 2012.

College statistics

|-
| align="left" | 1993–94
| align="left" | Utah
| 25 || 24 || 29.6 || .516 || .443 || .775 || 8.3 || 0.8 || 0.8 || 1.6 || 18.3
|-
| align="left" | 1994–95
| align="left" | Utah
| 33 || 33 || 30.1 || .545 || .386 || .856 || 8.5 || 1.4 || 0.8 || 0.8 || 21.0
|-
| align="left" | 1995–96
| align="left" | Utah
| 32 || - || 30.9 || .538 || .409 || .851 || 8.8 || 1.0 || 0.7 || 0.7 || 21.4
|-
| align="left" | 1996–97
| align="left" | Utah
| 32 || 32 || 31.5 || .492 || .387 || .904 || 9.5 || 1.4 || 0.7 || 1.2 || 22.0
|- class="sortbottom"
| style="text-align:center;" colspan="2"| Career
| 122 || 89 || 30.6 || .522 || .401 || .851 || 8.8 || 1.2 || 0.7 || 1.0 || 20.8
|}

Professional career

New Jersey Nets
Van Horn was drafted as the second overall pick in the 1997 NBA draft by the Philadelphia 76ers; however, his rights were immediately traded to the New Jersey Nets along with Michael Cage, Lucious Harris and Don MacLean in exchange for the draft rights to Tim Thomas and Anthony Parker and player contracts of Jim Jackson and Eric Montross.

Van Horn played for the Nets from 1997 to 2002. He was named to NBA All-Rookie First Team in his first season, averaging a team leading 19.7 points and 6.5 rebounds and leading the Nets to the 1998 NBA Playoffs, where they were swept in three games by the Chicago Bulls. His best season as came in 1999, where he averaged a team-leading 21.8 points per game (fifth in the NBA) as well as 8.5 rebounds per game. That season, on March 26, Van Horn blocked a career-high 6 shots, along with scoring 22 points, during a 100-91 loss to the Indiana Pacers. He was an important part of the 2001–02 Nets team that won the Eastern Conference Finals, leading the team in rebounding and placing second in scoring. In the deciding Game 5 of their first round matchup with the Pacers, Van Horn scored a postseason career-high 27 points during a 120-109 victory. He later hit the game-winning three-point shot against the Boston Celtics in game 6 of the Eastern Conference Finals to send the Nets to the 2002 NBA Finals, before they were eventually swept by the Los Angeles Lakers. He ranks in the Nets' top ten in several statistical categories including points, field goals made, three-point field goals made and attempted, and offensive and defensive rebounds.

Philadelphia 76ers
On August 6, 2002, Van Horn was traded to his original team, the Philadelphia 76ers, along with Todd MacCulloch for center Dikembe Mutombo. He spent one year with the 76ers placing second on the team in scoring (15.9 per game) and rebounding (7.1 per game), while in the postseason the 76ers advanced past the New Orleans Hornets in the first round, before being eliminated by the finals-bound Detroit Pistons in the Eastern Conference Semifinals.

New York Knicks and Milwaukee Bucks
After spending a year with the 76ers he was traded to the New York Knicks for Latrell Sprewell in a four team deal that also included the Atlanta Hawks and Minnesota Timberwolves. His stint with the Knicks, although productive, was short; on February 16, 2004, he was traded to the Milwaukee Bucks in a three team trade for Tim Thomas. On March 21, 2004, Van Horn scored his highest single game total in Milwaukee, 32 points during a 104-103 loss to the Lakers. In the playoffs, however, Van Horn and the Bucks would be eliminated in the first round by the eventual-champion Pistons.

Dallas Mavericks
In order to make salary cap room for the signing of free-agent-to-be Michael Redd in the coming off-season, on February 24, 2005, the Bucks traded Van Horn to the Dallas Mavericks for the expiring contracts of Alan Henderson, Calvin Booth and cash. He spent nearly two seasons with the Mavericks playing a key sixth man role and helping the Mavericks win the Western Conference Finals before losing in the NBA Finals to the Miami Heat.

Free agency and retirement
Following the 2005–06 season, he took a year off in order to spend time with his family. On February 19, 2008, Van Horn signed a three-year deal (only the first year guaranteed) with the Mavericks in order to help complete a blockbuster trade that sent Jason Kidd from the Nets to the Mavericks and Devin Harris to the Nets. As expected, Van Horn did not play at all for the Nets and was waived on October 23, 2008, and earned $4.3 million without playing.

Van Horn finished his NBA career with averages of 16.0 points per game and nearly seven rebounds per game.

Personal life
Van Horn's and the Nets' success in his rookie year led him to be the first white player on the cover of SLAM Magazine. He was also on the cover of NBA Jam 99 for the Nintendo 64 and Game Boy Color.

Van Horn lived in Franklin Lakes, New Jersey during his time with the New Jersey Nets. Keith Van Horn lives in Bow Mar, Colorado, with his wife, Amy, and four children. Van Horn's eldest daughter Sabrina was born near the end of his sophomore year at Utah, followed by his son Nick and two other daughters Noelle and Haley. Sabrina played soccer for Mullen High School in Denver. Van Horn helped coach the basketball teams of his two other daughters. Having counseled Van Horn through the death of his father during his freshman season, Rick Majerus became close to Van Horn and was the godfather of Noelle.

He purchased some on-the-river Colorado land and co-founded the Lincoln Hills Fly Fishing Club but later sold his majority interest in the club. Van Horn has a real estate investment firm; a school for kids with special needs; a mobile software company called Accuworks that created another mobile software company called Branded Business Apps.

Van Horn runs the Colorado Premier Basketball Club, a non-profit youth basketball program involving around 1,000 kids from the Denver area. The club, claimed to be Colorado's largest basketball club, provides leagues, coaching, camps and tournaments for around 1,000 kids from the Denver area.

NBA career statistics

Regular season 

|-
| style="text-align:left;"| 1997–98
| style="text-align:left;"| New Jersey
| 62 || 62 || 37.5 || .426 || .308 || .846 || 6.6 || 1.7 || 1.0 || .4 || 19.7
|-
| style="text-align:left;"| 1998–99
| style="text-align:left;"| New Jersey
| 42 || 42 || 37.5 || .428 || .302 || .859 || 8.5 || 1.5 || 1.0 || 1.3 || 21.8
|-
| style="text-align:left;"| 1999–00
| style="text-align:left;"| New Jersey
| 80 || 80 || 34.8 || .445 || .368 || .847 || 8.5 || 2.0 || .8 || .8 || 19.2
|-
| style="text-align:left;"| 2000–01
| style="text-align:left;"| New Jersey
| 49 || 47 || 35.4 || .435 || .382 || .806 || 7.1 || 1.7 || .8 || .4 || 17.0
|-
| style="text-align:left;"| 2001–02
| style="text-align:left;"| New Jersey
| 81 || 81 || 30.4 || .433 || .345 || .800 || 7.5 || 2.0 || .8 || .5 || 14.8
|-
| style="text-align:left;"| 2002–03
| style="text-align:left;"| Philadelphia
| 74 || 73 || 31.6 || .482 || .369 || .804 || 7.1 || 1.3 || .9 || .4 || 15.9
|-
| style="text-align:left;"| 2003–04
| style="text-align:left;"| New York
| 47 || 47 || 33.5 || .445 || .373 || .819 || 7.3 || 1.8 || 1.1 || .4 || 16.4
|-
| style="text-align:left;"| 2003–04
| style="text-align:left;"| Milwaukee
| 25 || 15 || 30.6 || .472 || .458 || .945 || 6.3 || 1.5 || .6 || .6 || 15.7
|-
| style="text-align:left;"| 2004–05
| style="text-align:left;"| Milwaukee
| 33 || 13 || 24.8 || .449 || .385 || .862 || 5.0 || 1.2 || .6 || .3 || 10.4
|-
| style="text-align:left;"| 2004–05
| style="text-align:left;"| Dallas
| 29 || 3 || 23.6 || .462 || .375 || .783 || 4.4 || 1.2 || .5 || .3 || 12.2
|-
| style="text-align:left;"| 2005–06
| style="text-align:left;"| Dallas
| 53 || 0 || 20.6 || .424 || .368 || .832 || 3.6 || .7 || .6 || .2 || 8.9
|- class="sortbottom"
| style="text-align:center;" colspan="2"| Career
| 575 || 463 || 31.6 || .443 || .361 || .835 || 6.8 || 1.6 || .8 || .5 || 16.0

Playoffs 

|-
| style="text-align:left;"| 1998
| style="text-align:left;"| New Jersey
| 3 || 3 || 25.7 || .448 || .000 || .800 || 3.0 || .3 || .0 || .0 || 12.7
|-
| style="text-align:left;"| 2002
| style="text-align:left;"| New Jersey
| 20 || 20 || 32.2 || .402 || .440 || .714 || 6.7 || 2.1 || 1.0 || .5 || 13.3
|-
| style="text-align:left;"| 2003
| style="text-align:left;"| Philadelphia
| 12 || 12 || 33.5 || .382 || .438 || .900 || 7.5 || .8 || .8 || .2 || 10.4
|-
| style="text-align:left;"| 2004
| style="text-align:left;"| Milwaukee
| 5 || 2 || 27.4 || .333 || .364 || .667 || 4.6 || 1.4 || 1.4 || .6 || 8.0
|-
| style="text-align:left;"| 2005
| style="text-align:left;"| Dallas
| 3 || 0 || 11.0 || .467 || .000 || .889 || 2.0 || .3 || .3 || .0 || 7.3
|-
| style="text-align:left;"| 2006
| style="text-align:left;"| Dallas
| 14 || 3 || 12.3 || .339 || .286 || 1.000 || 2.3 || .1 || .0 || .3 || 3.6
|- class="sortbottom"
| style="text-align:center;" colspan="2"| Career
| 57 || 40 || 25.7 || .388 || .391 || .795 || 5.1 || 1.1 || .6 || .3 || 9.5

Achievements
College:
 First Team All-WAC 1994, 1995, 1996, 1997
 WAC Player of the Year 1995, 1996, 1997
 Associated Press All American 1996
 Associated Press All American 1997
 1997 ESPN Men's College Basketball Player of the Year
 University of Utah Men's Basketball "All Century Team"
 WAC Champions (1995,1996,1997), University of Utah
Professional:
 NBA All Rookie First Team 1998
 Fifth NBA Scoring 1999
 2002 Eastern Conference Championship, New Jersey Nets
 New Jersey Nets Top Ten Career Leader in points, field goals made, three-point field goals made and attempted, free throws made and attempted, offensive and defensive rebounds
 2006 Western Conference Championship, Dallas Mavericks

See also
 List of NCAA Division I men's basketball players with 2,000 points and 1,000 rebounds

References

Further reading
 Richard Corman (1999). Glory: Photographs of Athletes
 Terri Ellefsen and Salt Lake Tribune (1998). Runnin’ Utes Basketball
 Carl W. Grody (2001). Sports Great Keith Van Horn
 Diane Long (2000). He's Just My Dad, Portraits of Celebrity Athletes and their Children
 Rick Majerus with Gene Wojciechowski (2000). My Life on a Napkin: Pillow Mints, Playground Dreams and Coaching the Runnin' Utes

External links

 Keith Van Horn biography on NBA.com (archived from 2003)
 Keith Van Horn: An NBA Rarity

1975 births
Living people
All-American college men's basketball players
American men's basketball players
American people of Dutch descent
Basketball players from California
Dallas Mavericks players
Milwaukee Bucks players
New Jersey Nets players
New York Knicks players
People from Diamond Bar, California
People from Franklin Lakes, New Jersey
Philadelphia 76ers draft picks
Philadelphia 76ers players
Small forwards
Sportspeople from Bergen County, New Jersey
Sportspeople from Fullerton, California
Utah Utes men's basketball players